Viktor Schauberger (30 June 1885 – 25 September 1958) was an Austrian forest caretaker, naturalist, philosopher, inventor and biomimicry experimenter.

Schauberger developed his own ideas based on what he observed in nature. In Implosion magazine, a magazine released by Schauberger's family, he said that aeronautical and marine engineers had incorrectly designed the propeller. He stated:
As best demonstrated by Nature in the case of the aerofoil maple-seed, today’s propeller is a pressure-screw and therefore a braking screw, whose purpose is to allow the heavy maple-seed to fall parachute-like slowly towards the ground and to be carried away sideways by the wind in the process. No bird has such a whirling thing on its head, nor a fish on its tail. Only man made use of this natural brake-screw for forward propulsion. As the propeller rotates, so does the resistance rise by the square of the rotational velocity. This is also a sign that this supposed propulsive device is unnaturally constructed and therefore out of place.

Early life 
Schauberger was born in Holzschlag, Upper Austria on 30 June 1885. His parents were Leopold Schauberger and Josefa, née Klimitsch. From 1891 to 1897 he attended the elementary school in Aigen, then until 1900 the state grammar school in Linz. Until 1904 he went to the forestry school in Aggsbach in the Kartause Aggsbach, where he passed the exam as a forester. From 1904 to 1906 he was forest clerk in Groß-Schweinbarth in Lower Austria.

Films 
In 1930, "Tragendes Wasser" was filmed, showing the functioning of the log flumes.

Nature Was My Teacher, narrated by Tom Brown (1993, Borderland Science Research Foundation) 

Sacred Living Geometry: The Enlightened Environmental Theories of Viktor Schauberger, narrated by Callum Coats (1995, Talkstudio)

Extraordinary Nature of Water, narrated by Callum Coats (2000, Filmstream)

Viktor Schauberger: Comprehend and Copy Nature, directed by Franz Fitzke (2007, Schauberger Verlag)

Books 
Schauberger, Viktor: Unsere sinnlose Arbeit - Die Quelle der Weltkrise, Der Aufbau durch Atomverwandlung, nicht Atomzertrümmerung (1933, Krystall-Verlag GmbH, 2001, Jörg Schauberger) (Released in English as "Our Senseless Toil - The Cause of the World Crisis - Progress Through Transformation of the Atom - Not its destruction!")

Schauberger, Viktor & Coats, Callum: Eco-Technology 1: The Water Wizard - The Extraordinary Properties of Natural Water (1998, Gateway Books)

Schauberger, Viktor & Coats, Callum: Eco-Technology 2: Nature as Teacher - New Principles in the Working of Nature (1999, Gateway Books)

Schauberger, Viktor & Coats, Callum: Eco-Technology 3: The Fertile Earth - Nature's Energies in Agriculture, Soil Fertilisation and Forestry (1999, Gateway Books)

Schauberger, Viktor & Coats, Callum: Eco-Technology 4: Energy Evolution - Harnessing Free Energy from Nature (2000, Gateway Books)

Notes

Further reading

Andersson, Olof: Living Water: Viktor Schauberger and the Secrets of Natural Energy (2002, Gateway Books)

Bartholomew, Alick: Hidden Nature: The Startling Insights of Viktor Schauberger (2004, Floris Books)

Coats, Callum: Living Energies: An Exposition of Concepts Related to the Theories of Viktor Schauberger (1996, 2001, Gateway Books)

Cobbald, Jane: Viktor Schauberger: A Life of Learning from Nature (2006, Floris Books)

External links

  The Schauberger Family Trust (PKS) maintains an archive with many of Viktor Schauberger's original manuscripts and a small museum with models and prototypes by Viktor Schauberger
 Institute of Ecological Technology has a research programme on Viktor Schauberger's ideas and inventions
 Our Senseless Toil - an excerpt of Schauberger's own writing
 "Die Natur Kapieren und Kopieren" ( Comprehend and Copy Nature, dubbed in English ) Viktor Schauberger documentary film (2008) on Science | Documentaries by wocomoDOCS YouTube channel  
 Viktor Schauberger – Die Natur kapieren und kopieren (German language DVD), Gestaltung: Franz Fitzke, 75 min., Schauberger Verlag, 2008, .
 "Nature Was My Teacher" The Vision Of Viktor Schauberger a documentary by Tom Brown (1991) ; on sound recordist David Brown's YouTube channel

1885 births
1958 deaths
Austrian naturalists
Austrian foresters
Austrian biologists
20th-century Austrian philosophers
Austrian inventors
Bionics
People from Rohrbach District
Criticism of science
Fringe science
20th-century biologists
20th-century naturalists